Ghanashyam Khatiwada is a Nepalese Politician and serving as the Member Of House Of Representatives (Nepal) elected from Morang-1, Province No. 1. He is the member of the Nepal Communist Party and represents the constituency of Morang 1.

References

Living people
Nepal MPs 2017–2022
Nepal Communist Party (NCP) politicians
Communist Party of Nepal (Unified Marxist–Leninist) politicians
1961 births